Clyattville is an unincorporated community and census-designated place (CDP) in Lowndes County, Georgia, United States. It was established in the 1840s.

Clyattville was first listed as a CDP in the 2020 census with a population of 552.

History
When Clyattville was first settled, there were only a few families to establish residence. These families included the Brays, the Hunters, the Lanes, the Arnolds, the Covingtons, the Quillians, and the Clyatts.

Clyattville has not always been located at is current location. From 1837 to 1848, the community was known as Forest Grove and was located to the north-west of the current location. It was centered around the Forest Grove Primitive Baptist Church. The only current sign of Forest Grove is the local cemetery by the same name, which still serves as the primary cemetery for modern Clyattville. In 1848, the post office for the community was transferred a short distance away to the store of James M. Clyatt. Clyatt's store had existed for about a decade at that point along a stagecoach route between Troupville, Georgia and Bellville, Florida. The store was previously owned by James Claytt's father Samuel Mills Clyatt, who had owned a plantation which covered most of the area around Clyattville.

In the late 1890s, the Valdosta Railway was built between Valdosta, Georgia and Madison, Florida. The route of railroad bypassed the location of Old Clyattville by less than a mile. The community shifted towards where the old stage coach route crossed the railway.

The first store in modern Clyattville was owned by the Bray family. Since then, many more stores have been established, including Zipperer's Grocery (located across the street from the Clyattville Elementary School); a Minute Markest, now a Holiday Market (on the Lake Park-Clyattville Highway); J.W.'s Grocery (located on the Madison Highway); and Clyattville 66 (located at the corner of the Madison Highway and the Lake Park-Clyattville Highway). There once was a grist mill, a cotton gin, a drugstore, and only one church, the Methodist Church.

Early Clyattville was mainly agricultural, and its community thrived on farming. In the early 1950s, Owens-Illinois built a paper mill and a bag plant. C.A. Baucom built a cotton gin.

Residents traveled by buggies or wagon until they could afford cars. The first person to own a car in Clyattville was Dr. Quillian. His office was a wooden building in Olympia (the old saw mill town along the route of the Valdosta Railway).

Demographics

2020 census

Note: the US Census treats Hispanic/Latino as an ethnic category. This table excludes Latinos from the racial categories and assigns them to a separate category. Hispanics/Latinos can be of any race.

Geography
Clyattville is located approximately 6.5 miles south-southwest of Valdosta on Georgia State Route 31 (Madison Highway).

 Georgia State Route 31
 Georgia State Route 376

School
Clyattville Elementary School is located in the Clyattville area.  It belongs to the Lowndes County School System.

References

External links

Census-designated places in Lowndes County, Georgia